Émilienne Berthe Galicier (11 June 1911 – 7 July 2007) was a French politician. She was elected to the National Assembly in 1945 as one of the first group of French women in parliament. She served in the National Assembly until 1958.

Biography
Galicier was born in Villeneuve-sur-Yonne in 1911 into a family of winegrowers. She left school aged 11 and worked for a middle-class family and then worked at a factory. Due to unemployment, she left Villeneuve-sur-Yonne in search of work, finding a job in a delicatessen. She became involved in trade union activities, joining a butchers union.

In 1935 she joined the French Communist Party (PCF) and during World War II, she was a member of the French Resistance. She was an PCF candidate in Nord department in the 1945 National Assembly elections. The third-placed candidate on the PCF list, she was elected to parliament, becoming one of the first group of women in the National Assembly. She was re-elected in July 1946, and during her second term in parliament served as a member of the Commission for Reconstruction and War Damages and the Committee for Agriculture and Food Supply. She was re-elected again in November 1946, after which she was a member of the Food Commission and the Press Commission.

Although Galicier was moved down to fourth place on the PCF list for the 1951 elections, she was re-elected and rejoined the same commissions. She was re-elected in 1956, again in fourth place on the PCF list, after which she became a member of the Labour and Social Security Commission. She lost her seat in the 1958 elections, which saw the PCF reduced from 150 to ten seats.

References

1911 births
French trade unionists
French Communist Party politicians
Deputies of the 1st National Assembly of the French Fourth Republic
Deputies of the 2nd National Assembly of the French Fourth Republic
Deputies of the 3rd National Assembly of the French Fourth Republic
Women members of the National Assembly (France)
2007 deaths
French women trade unionists
20th-century French politicians
20th-century French women politicians
People from Yonne
French Resistance members